Leskea polycarpa is a species of moss belonging to the family Leskeaceae.

It is native to Eurasia and North America.

References

Hypnales